Goniorhynchus hampsoni is a moth in the family Crambidae. It is found in Peru and Costa Rica.

References

Moths described in 1939
Spilomelinae